Élie Bonal, (born on 12 February 1945, in La Salvetat), is a French former rugby union and league footballer who played as wing.

After a rugby union career for Stade Toulousain, he switched to league in 1970, playing for Carcassonne, taking part at the 1970 and 1975 Rugby League World Cups.

Biography 
His brothers, Jean-Marie and Patrick, as well his nephew, Sébastien Viars, were also rugby internationals.

Honours 

 Team : 
 Winner of the French Championship : 1972 (Carcassonne).
 Runner-up at the Lord Derby Cup : 1973 (Carcassonne).

References

External links 

Elie Bonal profile at rugbyleagueproject.com

1945 births
Living people
AS Carcassonne players
France national rugby league team players
French rugby league players
Rugby league wingers
Rugby union wings
Sportspeople from Cantal
Stade Toulousain players